
Wolfensohn is a surname. Notable people with the surname include:

 Avraham Wolfensohn (1783–1855), rabbi and Talmudic judge
 James Wolfensohn (1933–2020), Australian-American economist, World Bank president

Wolfenson 

 Moisés Wolfenson (born 1966), a Jewish Peruvian congressman

See also 
 Ben-Zeev, Hebrew for Wolf's son
 Wolfsohn, Wolffsohn
 Wolfson (disambiguation)

References 

German-language surnames
Jewish surnames
Yiddish-language surnames